The 2014–15 Greek Football Cup was the 73rd edition of the Greek Football Cup. A total of 46 clubs, just as the last edition, were accepted to enter. The competition commenced on 28 August 2014 with the preliminary round and concluded on 23 May 2015 with the final, at the Olympic Stadium. The winner of the competition was Olympiacos for 27th time.

Teams

Calendar

Participating clubs

Preliminary round
The draw for this round took place on 18 August 2014.

South Group

Summary

|}

Matches

Panachaiki won 4–1 on aggregate.

Chania won 7–2 on aggregate.

Apollon Smyrnis won 3–2 on aggregate.

Fostiras won 1–0 on aggregate.

AEK Athens won 5–0 on aggregate.

Ermionida won on away goals.

Iraklis Psachna won 3–1 on aggregate.

North Group

Matches

|}

Matches

Apollon Kalamarias won 6–0 on aggregate.

Iraklis won on away goals.

Aiginiakos won on away goals.

Tyrnavos won 3–1 on aggregate.

Zakynthos won 6–0 on aggregate.

Ethnikos Gazoros won on away goals.

Olympiacos Volos won 1–0 on aggregate.

Group stage
The draw for this round took place on 15 September 2014.

Group A

Group B

Group C

Group D

Group E

Group F

Group G

Group H

Knockout phase
Each tie in the knockout phase, apart from the final, was played over two legs, with each team playing one leg at home. The team that scored more goals on aggregate over the two legs advanced to the next round. If the aggregate score was level, the away goals rule was applied, i.e. the team that scored more goals away from home over the two legs advanced. If away goals were also equal, then extra time was played. The away goals rule was again applied after extra time, i.e. if there were goals scored during extra time and the aggregate score was still level, the visiting team advanced by virtue of more away goals scored. If no goals were scored during extra time, the winners were decided by a penalty shoot-out. In the final, which were played as a single match, if the score was level at the end of normal time, extra time was played, followed by a penalty shoot-out if the score was still level.The mechanism of the draws for each round is as follows:
In the draw for the round of 16, the eight group winners are seeded, and the eight group runners-up are unseeded.The seeded teams are drawn against the unseeded teams, with the seeded teams hosting the second leg.
In the draws for the quarter-finals onwards, there are no seedings, and teams from the same group can be drawn against each other.

Bracket

Round of 16
The draw for this round took place on 9 January 2015.

Seeding

Summary

|}

Matches

Panionios won 3–2 on aggregate.

OFI won 5–0 on aggregate.

Iraklis won 2–1 on aggregate.

Apollon Smyrnis won 5–2 on aggregate.

Chania won 5–3 on penalties.

Olympiacos won 11–0 on aggregate.

Skoda Xanthi won 2–1 on aggregate.

AEK Athens won 3–1 on aggregate.

Quarter-finals
The draw for this round took place on 30 January 2015.

Summary

|}

Matches

Apollon Smyrnis won 4–2 on aggregate.

Skoda Xanthi won 4–1 on aggregate.

Iraklis won 4–3 on penalties.

Match suspended at 90th minute while the score was 0–1.

Olympiacos won 4–1 on aggregate.

Semi-finals
The draw for this round took place on 17 March 2015.

Summary

|}

Matches

Olympiacos won 4–1 on aggregate.

Skoda Xanthi won 1–0 on aggregate.

Final

References

External links
2014–15 Greek Football Cup at the Greek Football Federation site (Greek)

Greek Football Cup seasons
Cup
Greek Cup